Christiane Koschier-Bitante (19 September 1974) is an Austrian former cyclist. She won the Austrian National Road Race Championships in 1993.

References

External links
 

1974 births
Living people
Austrian female cyclists
Sportspeople from Innsbruck
20th-century Austrian women